Tipsuda Thavaramara served as the Deputy Secretary-General (2014-2019) of Thailand's Securities and Exchange Commission, in charge of the policy and corporate finance groups.

Education 
Thavaramara received her MBA from the Wharton School at the University of Pennsylvania, and her BA in Mathematics from Harvard University.

Career 
Thavaramara joined the SEC in 1993, and has extensive experience in capital market development. She played an active role in creating the Thai Bond Market Association, drafting the Derivatives Law, launching the Thailand Futures Exchange, and formulating the implementation plan for ASEAN capital market integration. She also served on the Board of the Government Pension Fund from 2007 to 2011.

Publications
 Experiences of Financial Distress in Thailand - World Bank Publications - by Tipsuda Sundaravej and Prasarn Trairatvorakul
 One decade SEC : first decade of the Thai SEC and capital market in Thailand (1992–2002) - Member of Editorial Team
 Ending the SET monopoly raises lengthy questions - Bangkok Post, April 30, 2012

References

Living people
Year of birth missing (living people)
Harvard University alumni
Tipsuda Thavaramara
Wharton School of the University of Pennsylvania alumni